Alexandra Park School is a coeducational secondary school and sixth form with academy status, located in the Muswell Hill area of the London Borough of Haringey, England.

The school provides education for students aged 11–18. Since opening in 1999, the school has continued to grow and develop; gaining specialist schools status in 2005. Its headteacher is Michael McKenzie.

The school draws its students from a wide geographical area that includes the relatively prosperous wards in the borough as well as some of the most deprived wards in the country: over 40% of the total intake comes from the latter area.  The percentage of students speaking a language other than English is well above average, as is the proportion entitled to a free school meal and the proportion of students who have a learning difficulty or disability. The school is involved in the National College for School Leadership, provides extended service and holds the following awards: Investors in People, Sports Mark and Healthy Schools.

Alexandra Park School has exchange student programmes. Due to their specialist school status, Alexandra Park can offer students an Astronomy GCSE. This started in 2009 offered to year nine students.

History
There have been at least three schools with this name in Muswell Hill. The present school was opened to year 7 pupils on 9 September 1999. The extension in 2006 won a commendation at the Civic Trust Awards.

The expansion of Alexandra Park School has added a number of key elements: a main teaching block for art and design technology, with general teaching spaces and a sixth form suite overlooking a courtyard; a science centre with four laboratories; and a performance arts department, with a drama studio and music practice rooms. The scheme was designed and built to a fast timetable, and incorporated a number of "green" technologies.

Location
The school is named after Alexandra Park, Muswell Hill which is located c. away from the school. The present school is at the edge of Muswell Hill Golf Course. The main entrance is on Durnsford Park and there is also an entrance on Rhodes Avenue.

ICT
Alexandra Park School is now part of the ICT Register, a database which captures ICT and eLearning expertise in schools and learning centres across the world. It is, however, not listed on the London schools page of the ICT Register. It hopes this will contribute to driving up standards of teaching and learning in ICT and encourage students to become independent learners.

In October, the school launched the revolutionary iLearning concept for ICT across the curriculum. The 5 i philosophy embraces national initiatives and local-school terminology in order to allow students to become independent learners through the use of ICT throughout the curriculum.

Ofsted inspections
Following the school's first Ofsted inspection in November 2002 the school was judged "A very good school which enables all its pupils to do well.  Standards are much higher than might be expected of pupils with similar backgrounds and prior attainment.  This is due to good teaching, excellent leadership and management, high expectations of work and behaviour and a real commitment to ensuring that every single pupil benefits from what is provided and is encouraged to give their best."  Ofsted commented that "the quality of teaching is a significant strength of the school".

In the school's second Ofsted inspection in May 2007 the school was judged "A good school with some outstanding features. Although the school is relatively new, its standing in the community and beyond is well established because of the outstanding leadership of the Headteacher."  The report highlights the outstanding features with Ofsted commenting "Care, guidance and support are good and the pastoral provision is outstanding, which contributes effectively to pupils' personal development. Vulnerable students and those with learning difficulties and disabilities are mostly exceptionally well supported. "

Following the previous reports there has been a new one. Alexandra Park School was rated 'outstanding' after its inspection on 15–16 November 2011. The school received 1s (outstanding) on most areas.  Alexandra Park School got three 2s (good) these subjects were: The extent to which pupils adopt a healthy life style, Pupils behaviour and Pupils attendance. The overall comment was 'Alexandra Park School is an outstanding school.  It is a reflective and self-critical organisation which lives its aim to "put learning first" through its every action.  Students are highly motivated learners who make rapid progress through outstanding teaching, an excellent curriculum and exemplary care and support.'

It is also a National Teaching School, a status which is given to less than 2% of schools in England. Under this scheme they collaborate with a range of providers including the Institute of Education, Middlesex University and Goldsmiths to work with training teachers and local schools to enhance teaching knowledge and build local connections through education.

References

3. Goose, M., Robinson, H., MacGillivray, L., O'Neill. (2014). Life and Times of Jay Cockrell. Portland Green 2013–14 22–34

4. Ross, J., Goose, M. (2014). Awesome Awesome bible. Hellooooo Portland Green 1–4

External links
 Official school website
 APSA the Alexandra Park School Association

Educational institutions established in 1999
Academies in the London Borough of Haringey
1999 establishments in England
Secondary schools in the London Borough of Haringey
Wood Green
Muswell Hill